Tomás Ó Cobhthaigh (died 1474) was an Irish poet.

Ó Cobhthaigh was a member of a brehon family from County Westmeath. The Annals of the Four Masters contain his obit, sub anno 1474.

 Thomas, the son of Donnell O'Coffey, died.

See also

 Charles Coffey (died 1745)
 Aeneas Coffey (1780–1852)
 William Coffey (VC) (1829–1875)
 Brian Coffey (1905–1995)

References
 http://www.ucc.ie/celt/published/T100005D/
 http://www.irishtimes.com/ancestor/surname/index.cfm?fuseaction=Go.&UserID=

Medieval Irish poets
People from County Westmeath
1474 deaths
15th-century Irish poets
Year of birth unknown
Irish male poets